Bill Hoff (born August 27, 1964) is an American stock car racing driver. He last competed part-time in the NASCAR K&N Pro Series East, driving the No. 71 Chevrolet for Ace Motorsports. Previously, Hoff ran in NASCAR's Busch Series on a limited schedule from 1996 to 2004, usually competing at tracks in the Northeast. He is also a radio broadcaster on 93.3 WMMR in Philadelphia, Pennsylvania.

Early career

Hoff drove a Formula Atlantic car in SCCA Amateur competition from 1990 to 1992. He spent 1994 testing a Lola-Cosworth Indy car.

NASCAR

Busch Series
Hoff made his debut in 1996, running the No. 59 Chevy at New Hampshire. He started the race in 40th and finished 39th. He then returned to the fall race at Dover, repeating his New Hampshire feat with a 40th place start and 39th-place finish. He did not complete either race and the longest he lasted in one was twelve laps at New Hampshire.

He would make one start in 1997. He started 34th and finished 35th at Nazareth.

Hoff's busiest season was in 2001. As the economy was in a recession, Hoff seized the opportunity to make the races that not a lot of teams showed up to, running nine races for his own #93 Hoff Racing team. He finished 41st in his first start of the year at Rockingham, not finishing as the last car despite only running twenty laps. Hoff would not finish any of his other starts, either. However, he did manage a best finish of 33rd at Watkins Glen. He also set his best career start of 38th at Gateway. Hoff finished 62nd in points, his best career showing.

Hoff scaled his schedule down to five races in 2002. His best run of the year was at Nazareth, where he managed 35th. He also matched his best career qualifying effort of 38th there. His other runs only managed 36th, 41st, 42nd and 43rd.

Hoff ran three races in 2003, running the first two for his own team. After a 34th at Nazareth, Hoff ran an eventual career-best 24th at New Hampshire. Despite not completing twenty of the laps, it was Hoff's first career race that he finished. Then, at Dover, Hoff ran a Bost Motorsports car. He started that race in his career-best 28th before finishing 38th.

Hoff made two more starts in 2004. After finishing 37th at Nazareth and 35th at Milwaukee, Hoff shut down his team. Hoff's career totalled twenty-two starts.

K&N Pro Series East

In 2000, Hoff attempted one race in what was then the NASCAR Busch North Series at Nazareth Speedway, which was a combined race in conjunction with the Busch Series. However, he failed to qualify for the event.

Hoff returned to NASCAR racing during the 2018 NASCAR K&N Pro Series East season. He finished 16th at New Jersey Motorsports Park, failing to complete a single lap due to mechanical issues. Hoff entered his No. 71 Chevrolet again at Thompson Speedway Motorsports Park, but withdrew after engine trouble in practice.

Motorsports career results

NASCAR
(key) (Bold – Pole position awarded by qualifying time. Italics – Pole position earned by points standings or practice time. * – Most laps led.)

Busch Series

K&N Pro Series East

ARCA Re/Max Series
(key) (Bold – Pole position awarded by qualifying time. Italics – Pole position earned by points standings or practice time. * – Most laps led.)

References

External links
 
 Biography at Hoff Motorsports

Living people
NASCAR drivers
ARCA Menards Series drivers
1964 births
People from Bucks County, Pennsylvania
Racing drivers from Philadelphia